Stephen Joffe (born August 23, 1991) is a Canadian actor and singer. He is best known for his role as Alex in the television series Timeblazers.

Early life
Joffe was born in Toronto, Ontario on August 23, 1991 to Jewish parents. He graduated from the National Theatre School of Canada in 2012.

Career
Joffe begins his acting career when he appeared as Itchy in the children's television series Noddy.

Joffe went on to play the 8-year-old version of Noah Emmerich's character in the 2000 science fiction thriller film Frequency, featuring Dennis Quaid and Jim Caviezel.

Joffe played the role of Alan, the boyfriend of a dysfunctional woman, in the rework of The Crackwalker.

His television credits include P.R., Murdoch Mysteries, Life with Derek, Reign and Hudson & Rex.

From 2004 to 2006, he played the role of Alex in the American-Canadian television series Timeblazers.

Personal life
He plays mandolin and is the lead singer of a Toronto-based alternative rock boy band called Birds of Bellwoods.

Filmography

Film

Television

References

External links

1991 births
Canadian male film actors
Canadian male television actors
Canadian male child actors
Canadian male stage actors
20th-century Canadian male actors
21st-century Canadian male actors
Jewish Canadian male actors
Canadian people of Jewish descent
National Theatre School of Canada alumni
21st-century Canadian male singers
Living people